Denis Joel Martínez (born 10 April 1996) is an Argentine professional footballer who plays as a forward for Gimnasia y Tiro, on loan from Brown de Adrogué.

Career
Martínez began his career with Primera División side Lanús. He featured five times for the U20s at the 2016 U-20 Copa Libertadores in Paraguay, which preceded a loan spell to Primera B Nacional's Brown for the 2016–17 campaign. He made his professional debut on 28 October 2016 in a 2–1 loss against Estudiantes, prior to scoring his first senior goal in June 2017 versus Villa Dálmine. In total, Martínez played fourteen times and scored once for Brown. He returned to Lanús for the 2017–18 season and subsequently made his debut for the club on 11 December 2017 in a defeat away to Chacarita Juniors.

The opening goal of Martínez's Lanús career in July 2018 during a Copa Argentina win over Douglas Haig. Six months later, Martínez was loaned back to Primera B Nacional with Guillermo Brown. Three goals in twenty-eight matches followed across the next eighteen months there. In August 2020, Martínez left Lanús to rejoin Brown de Adrogué. In June 2022, Martínez was loaned out to Gimnasia y Tiro until the end of the year.

Career statistics
.

References

External links

1996 births
Living people
People from Quilmes Partido
Argentine footballers
Association football forwards
Argentine Primera División players
Primera Nacional players
Club Atlético Lanús footballers
Club Atlético Brown footballers
Guillermo Brown footballers
Gimnasia y Tiro footballers
Sportspeople from Buenos Aires Province